April Jane Adams (born 19 July 1973) is an Australian former diver. She competed in the 1992 Summer Olympics and placed second in the 1990 Commonwealth Games.

References

1973 births
Living people
Divers at the 1992 Summer Olympics
Australian female divers
Olympic divers of Australia
Commonwealth Games medallists in diving
Commonwealth Games silver medallists for Australia
Divers at the 1990 Commonwealth Games
20th-century Australian women
21st-century Australian women
Medallists at the 1990 Commonwealth Games